Green Roses is the third studio album by the Serbian Irish folk/Celtic rock band Orthodox Celts released in 1999.

Green Roses features sixteen songs, half of which were covers of traditional songs, and the other half the band's original songs. The album was produced by Aleksandar Radosavljević, and as guests appeared Dragoljub Marković (keyboards), Aleksandar Eraković (keyboards) and Goran Stojković (backing vocals).

In 2021 the album was polled 57th on the list of 100 Best Serbian Albums Since the Breakup of SFR Yugoslavia. The list was published in the book Kako (ni)je propao rokenrol u Srbiji (How Rock 'n' Roll in Serbia (Didn't) Came to an End).

Track list

Personnel 
 Aleksandar Petrović – vocals
 Ana Đokić – violin, backing vocals, arrangements
 Dušan Živanović – accordion, drums, percussion, bodhrán, backing vocals
 Dejan Lalić – mandolin, guitar, bagpipes, banjo, mandolin, backing vocals
 Vladan Jovković – guitar, backing vocals
 Dejan Jevtović – bass, backing vocals
 Dejan Popin – tin whistle, whistle, backing vocals

Additional personnel 
 Goran Stojković – backing vocals
Aleksandar Eraković – keyboards
Dragoljub Marković – keyboards
Aleksandar Radosavljević - producer
Velja Mijanović - mastering
Dušan Đokić - artwork
Anamarija Vartabedijan - design
Nebojša Stanković - design

Legacy
In 2021 the album was polled 57th on the list of 100 Best Serbian Albums Since the Breakup of SFR Yugoslavia. The list was published in the book Kako (ni)je propao rokenrol u Srbiji (How Rock 'n' Roll in Serbia (Didn't) Came to an End).

References

 Green Roses at Discogs

External links 
 Green Roses at Discogs

Orthodox Celts albums
1999 albums
Metropolis Records (Serbia) albums